Puka Nacua (born May 29, 2000) is an American football wide receiver for the BYU Cougars. He previously played at Washington.

Early life and high school
Nacua grew up in Provo, Utah and attended Orem High School in Orem, Utah. Nacua finished his high school career with 260 catches, 5,226 receiving yards, and 58 receiving touchdowns, all of which are Utah state records.

College career

Washington 
Nacua began his college career at Washington. He played in the first eight games of his freshman season and caught seven passes for 168 yards and two touchdowns before suffering a broken foot. Nacua had nine receptions for 151 yards and one touchdown in three games during the team's COVID-19-shortened 2020 season. Following the end of the season, he entered the NCAA transfer portal.

BYU 
Nacua ultimately transferred to BYU. In his first season with the team, he caught 40 passes for 805 yards and six touchdowns.

Personal life
Nacua's older brother, Samson, also plays wide receiver he transferred from the University of Utah at the same time that Puka transferred from Washington. Another older brother, Kai Nacua, played defensive back at BYU and in the National Football League (NFL).

References

External links
Washington Huskies bio
BYU Cougars bio

Living people
Players of American football from Utah
American football wide receivers
BYU Cougars football players
Washington Huskies football players
Year of birth missing (living people)